Macro-Mayan is a proposal linking the clearly established Mayan family with neighboring families that show similarities to Mayan. The term was apparently coined by McQuown (1942), but suggestions for historical relationships relevant to this hypothesis can be traced back to the Squier (1861), who offered comparisons between Mayan and Mixe-Zoquean languages, and Radin (1916, 1919, 1924), who did the same for Mixe-Zoquean, Huave, and Mayan.

History of proposals
McQuown (1942, 1956) defined Macro-Mayan as the hypothetical ancestor of Mayan, Mije-Sokean, and Totonacan, further promoting the hypothesis. However, his hypothesis relied on the presence of "a glottalized series" of consonants in both Mayan and Totonakan. Such a trait could have potentially spread through contact. McQuown also admitted that “the relatively small number of coincidences in vocabulary indicates to us that this kinship is quite distant” (McQuown 1942:37-38).

The hypothesis was not elaborated until 1979 when Brown and Witkowski put forth a proposal with 62 cognate sets and supposed sound correspondences between the two families. They also published two articles proposing a "Mesoamerican Phylum" composed of Macro-Mayan and other language families of Mesoamerica. This proposal was examined closely by Lyle Campbell and Terrence Kaufman who rejected the proposal because of serious flaws in the methodology that had been applied. They rejected almost all of the 62 cognates. First and foremost they found it important to identify all cases of linguistic diffusion before collecting possible cognates because diffusion has been widespread within the Mesoamerican Linguistic Area. The exchanges between Brown and Witkowski and Campbell and Kaufman took place in the journal American Anthropologist between 1978 and 1983.

In the late 1990s, Campbell (1997) expressed that he believed that Mayan would indeed some day prove to be related to Mixe–Zoquean and Totonacan, but that previous studies have not proven sufficient.

Nevertheless, since then, Brown et al. (2011) have presented arguments in favor of a Totozoquean, a common ancestor between Totonacan and Mixe-Zoquean. Moreover, Mora-Marín (2014, 2016) constitutes the most recent attempt to test the relationship between Mayan and Mixe-Zoquean. He proposes the existence of regular sound correspondences among lexical and grammatical comparanda between the two. By transitivity, these two proposals would connect all three language families, rekindling the Macro-Mayan hypothesis as framed by McQuown.

In Campbell's opinion, previous efforts to link Huave to Mayan, Mixe-Zoquean, Totonacan, or for that matter, any other language or family, has proven unfruitful, and "should thus be considered an isolate" (1997:161).

Related proposals
Stark (1972) proposed a Maya–Yunga–Chipayan macrofamily linking Mayan with the Chimuan and Uru–Chipaya language families of South America.

See also
Totozoquean languages
Penutian languages
Classification of indigenous languages of the Americas

References

Brown, Cecil H., and Stanley R. Witkowski. (1979). Aspects of the Phonological History of Mayan-Zoquean. International Journal of American Linguistics 45:34-47. 
Brown, Cecil H., David Beck, Grzegorz Kondrak, James K. Watters, and Søren Wichmann. (2011). Totozoquean. International Journal of American Linguistics 77: 323–372. 

Campbell, Lyle, and Terrence Kaufman. (1976).  A Linguistic Look at the Olmecs.  American Antiquity 41:80-89.
Campbell, Lyle, and Terrence Kaufman. (1980). On Mesoamerican Linguistics.  American Anthropologist 82:850-857. 
Campbell, Lyle, and Terrence Kaufman. (1983). Mesoamerican Historical Linguistics and Distant Genetic Relationship: Getting It Straight.  American Anthropologist 85:362-372. 
McQuown, Norman A. (1942). Una posible sintesis lingüística Macro-Mayance, Mayas y Olmecas 2.37-8 (Sociedad Mexicana de Antropología, Reunión de Mesa Redonda sobre Problemas Antropológicos de México y Centro América; México, 1942).
McQuown, Norman A. (1956). Evidence for a Synthetic Trend in Totonacan.  Language32:78-80.
Mora-Marín, David (2014). The Proto-Maya-Mijesokean Hypothesis: Change and Transformation in Approaches to An Old Problem. In Climates of Change: The Shifting Environment of Archaeology, edited by Sheila Kulyk, Cara G. Tremain, and Madeleine Sawyer, pp. 213–225. Proceedings of the 44thAnnual Chacmool Conference. Calgary: Chacmool Archaeological Association, University of Calgary.
Mora-Marín, David (2016). Testing the Proto-Mayan-Mijesokean Hypothesis. International Journal of American Linguistics 82:125-180. 
Radin, Paul. (1916). On the relationship of Huave and Mixe. American Anthropologist 18:411-421.
Radin, Paul. (1919).  The genetic relationship of the North American Indian languages, 489-502. University of California Publications in American Archaeology and Ethnology. Berkeley: University of California.
Radin, Paul. (1924). The relationship of Maya to Zoque-Huave. Journal de la Société des Américanistes de Paris16:317-324.
Squier, E. G. (1861). Monograph of Authors who have Written on the Languages of Central America.  Albany, New York.

Proposed language families